Hubert Suda (born 20 September 1969) is a retired Maltese international footballer.

References

Maltese footballers
Living people
1969 births

Association football forwards
Malta international footballers